The 2022–23 season is Fenerbahçe's 109th season in the existence of the club. The team plays in the Basketball Super League and in the EuroLeague.

Club

Board of Directors

Staff

Players

Squad information

Depth chart

Transactions

In

|}

Out

|}

Out on loan

|}

Pre-season and friendlies

Friendly match

Competitions

Overview

Presidential Cup

Matches

Basketball Super League

League table

Results summary

Results by round

Matches

EuroLeague

League table

Results summary

Results by round

Matches
Note: All times are CET (UTC+1) as listed by EuroLeague.

Turkish Basketball Cup

Quarterfinals

Statistics

Basketbol Süper Ligi

EuroLeague

References

Fenerbahçe men's basketball seasons
Fenerbahçe
Fenerbahçe